Justus Ellis McQueen Jr. (August 19, 1927 – July 9, 2022), known professionally as L.Q. Jones, was an American actor and director. He appeared in Sam Peckinpah's films Ride the High Country (1962), Major Dundee (1965), The Wild Bunch (1969), The Ballad of Cable Hogue (1970), and Pat Garrett and Billy the Kid (1973). His later film roles include Casino (1995), The Patriot, The Mask of Zorro (1998), and A Prairie Home Companion (2006).

His other roles included Western television series such as Cheyenne, Rawhide, Gunsmoke, Laramie, Wagon Train, and The Virginian. He was the writer and director of the 1975 science fiction film A Boy and His Dog, based on Harlan Ellison's novella of the same name.

Early life
Jones was born August 19, 1927, in Beaumont, in southeastern Texas, the son of Jessie Paralee (née Stephens) and Justus Ellis McQueen Sr., a railroad worker. At an early age he lost his mother when she died following a car accident. He completed his school education from Port Neches–Groves High School in 1945. After serving in the U.S. Navy from 1945 to 1946, Jones attended Lamar Junior College and Lon Morris College in Jacksonville, Texas, and then studied law, business and journalism at the University of Texas at Austin from 1950 to 1951. He worked as a stand-up comic, briefly played professional baseball and American football, and tried ranching in Nicaragua, then turned to acting after corresponding with Fess Parker, his former college roommate.

Career
Jones made his film debut in 1955 in Battle Cry, credited under his birth name Justus McQueen. His character's name in that film, however, was "L.Q. Jones", a name he liked and decided to adopt as his stage name for all of his future roles as an actor. In 1955, he was cast as "Smitty Smith" in three episodes of Clint Walker's ABC/Warner Brothers western series Cheyenne, the first hour-long western on network television.

Jones appeared in numerous films in the 1960s and 1970s. He became a member of Sam Peckinpah's stock company of actors, appearing in his Klondike series (1960–1961), Ride the High Country (1962), Major Dundee (1965), The Wild Bunch (1969), The Ballad of Cable Hogue (1970), and Pat Garrett and Billy the Kid (1973).

Jones was frequently cast alongside his close friend Strother Martin, most memorably as the posse member and bounty hunter "T. C." in The Wild Bunch. Jones also appeared as recurring characters on such western series as Cheyenne (1955), Gunsmoke (1955), Laramie, Two Faces West (1960–1961), and as ranch hand Andy Belden in The Virginian (1962). That same year (1962) Jones appeared as Ollie Earnshaw, a rich rancher looking for a bride, on Lawman, in the episode titled "The Bride".

He was cast in the military drama series Men of Annapolis, on the CBS western Johnny Ringo, and on the NBC western Jefferson Drum. He made two guest appearances on Perry Mason, including the role of con artist and murder victim Charles B. Barnaby in "The Case of the Lonely Heiress" (1958) and as Edward Lewis in "The Case of the Badgered Brother" (1963). He appeared in Hawaii Five-O, season 1, episode 15, in January, 1969. He also appeared in an episode of The A-Team titled "Cowboy George" and two episodes of The Fall Guy as Sheriff Dwight Leclerc. In 1971, Jones appeared as Belden in The Men From Shiloh (the final season rebranding of The Virginian) episode titled "The Town Killer".

Jones' other films include Men in War (1957), The Naked and the Dead (1958), Flaming Star (1960), Cimarron (1960), Hell Is for Heroes (1962), Hang 'Em High (1968), Stay Away, Joe (1968), The Brotherhood of Satan (1971), which he co-produced and wrote, Attack on Terror: The FBI vs. the Ku Klux Klan (1975), White Line Fever 1976 Lone Wolf McQuade (1983), Casino (1995), "Tornado!" (1996), The Edge (1997), The Mask of Zorro (1998), and A Prairie Home Companion (2006).

Jones directed, produced, and wrote the screenplay for A Boy and His Dog.

Personal life and death
Jones was a practicing Methodist and a registered Republican. On July 9, 2022, Jones died from natural causes at his Hollywood Hills home in Los Angeles at the age of 94.

Filmography

Film

Television

References

Further reading

External links
 
 
 L.Q. Jones at Aveleyman.com
 

1927 births
2022 deaths
20th-century American male actors
Methodists from Texas
American male film actors
American male television actors
California Republicans
Film directors from Texas
Hugo Award-winning writers
Lamar University alumni
Male Western (genre) film actors
Male actors from Texas
Military personnel from Texas
People from Beaumont, Texas
Texas Republicans
United States Navy personnel of World War II
University of Texas School of Law alumni
Western (genre) television actors